Curtohibolites is a genus of belemnite, an extinct group of cephalopods.

See also

Belemnite
List of belemnites

References

Belemnites